The  or  is a bay southeast of the island of Hokkaido in northern Japan. It has also been known as Iburi Bay and Volcano Bay.

History

The shoreline of Uchiura Bay was first settled by the Jōmon people as early as 4000 BC. Trade settlements have been found along its shoreline, such as the Ōfune Site where the Jōmon people relied on the body of water for trade routes to other Jōmon settlements in northern Tōhoku. In modern history, the bay was charted during the late-eighteenth century voyage of Royal Navy Commander William Robert Broughton and the crew of  during the eruption of nearby Mount Usu. Due to the eruptive activity, they labeled the bay as "Volcano Bay" in September 1796. Commander Broughton and his crew mingled extensively with the Ainu and Japanese living around the bay while they surveyed the bay's coastline. At a dinner they exchanged maps with the Japanese and conversed using Russian.

Geography
Uchiura Bay is a bay east of Oshima Peninsula that protrudes from the southwestern corner of Hokkaido south towards Honshu and to the south of western Iburi Subprefecture. Its opening to the Pacific Ocean is marked by a  line between Hokkaido Koma-ga-take and Cape Chikiu. It has been known as "Eruption Bay" as well as "Volcano Bay" due to the eruption of Mount Usu when the bay was being documented by Western explorers in the late-eighteenth century. In addition to Mount Usu, several other volcanoes line the shore of Uchiura Bay. It has also been called Iburi Bay, likely due to its proximity to Iburi Subprefecture.

Animal and plant life
The bay marks a junction between the arctic sea life seen in the waters surrounding northern Hokkaido and eastern Russia and the more temperate marine ecosystem seen around the rest of Japan. Arctic rainbow smelt, the Japanese lamprey, flounder, several species of shellfish, and kelp live in the waters of Uchiura Bay. The practice of farming scallops was first developed in the bay by the residents of the town of Toyoura on the bay's northern shore.

In Ainu mythology it is believed that a gigantic octopus kamuy lives in Uchiura Bay. The Kraken-like creature is known as Atkorkamuy and Akkorokamui among the Ainu and Japanese, respectively.

References

External links

Bays of Japan
Landforms of Hokkaido